Swelling index may refer to the following material parameters that quantify volume change:
 Crucible swelling index, also known as free swelling index, in coal assay
 Shrink–swell capacity in soil mechanics
 Unload-reload constant (κ) kin critical state soil mechanics

Mechanics
Materials science